Aap Ki Khatir is an Indian Hindi romantic comedy film directed by Dharmesh Darshan, starring Akshaye Khanna and Priyanka Chopra in lead roles. It also stars Ameesha Patel, Dino Morea, Sunil Shetty and Anupam Kher. It is based on 2005 American movie The Wedding Date.  It was released throughout India and internationally in late August 2006.

Upon release, the film received mixed reviews.

Plot
Anu (Priyanka Chopra), a London based NRI who is living in India after her boyfriend Danny (Dino Morea) ditched her at the altar. Now, she has come back to London to be a part of her sister Shirani's (Ameesha Patel) marriage, to the New York-based, Gujarati businessman Kunal Shah (Suniel Shetty), who is also Danny's best friend.

In a plan to get back to Danny and to make him jealous, Anu convinces her colleague Aman (Akshaye Khanna), to accompany her to the wedding as her new beau. Incidentally, Shirani was also involved with Danny earlier, which resulted in heartbreak for her too, as everyone learns of Danny's womanizing ways. Arjun Khanna (Anupam Kher) is the father of Shirani. Betty (Lilette Dubey), Anu's mother, married Arjun after her first husband died when Anu was little.

As time passes by, Aman finds Anu fascinating and later it develops into a fondness between the two. How Anu and Aman's relationship undergoes a change during the course of these incidents forms the crux of the story.

It turns out that Danny had used Kunal to get to Shirani and he believes that they can still be together. Shirani keeps trying to tell Danny that she loves Kunal. Anu reacts with Aman in an unfriendly way but later they form a friendship that in time turns into love. When Anu finds out about Danny's relationship with Shirani, she breaks down knowing that everyone knew (even Aman) but didn't tell her. She tells Aman to go away but Kunal (who thinks of Aman as a friend) convinces him to stay for his sake (Aap ki khatir). The truth is revealed to everyone and then they believe that Anu loves Aman.  Anu's parents convince her to go after Aman but she is too late as he has already left. When Shirani tells Kunal about Danny, he is heartbroken and chases Danny away. While chasing Danny, he finds Aman going away and he convinces Aman to ask Anu again for her love. He agrees and makes Kunal realize that he and Shirani are also meant to be together and to marry Shirani. Anu ends up marrying Aman and Kunal accepts Shirani happily after knowing the truth.

Cast
 Suniel Shetty as Kunal P.Shah
 Akshaye Khanna as Aman Mehra 
 Dino Morea as Danny Grover
 Ameesha Patel as Shirani A.Khanna
 Priyanka Chopra Jonas as Anu A.Khanna
 Bhumicka Singh as Nikki
 Anupam Kher as Arjun Khanna, Shirani's and Anu's father
 Lilette Dubey as Betty Khanna, Anu and Shirani's mother
 Tiku Talsania as Praful Shah, Kunal's father
 Kamini Khanna as Kunal's mother
 Mona Punjabi as Chachi
 Ananya Sharma as Sushi bua

Release

Critical reception
Anupama Chopra of India Today titled it as Out of steam and concluded that it is a move from wedding to divorce stories by Bollywood. Taran Adarsh of Bollywood Hungama gave it 2 stars out of 5, describing movie as a mediocre product that has some lively moments, but a weak second half and a climax that throws a wet blanket.

Box office
According to Box Office India, this movie collected 13.23 crores on a budget of 16 crores during its lifetime.

Soundtrack
The music is composed by Himesh Reshammiya, and the lyrics are penned by Sameer. The album has sixteen tracks, including seven remixes and two reprise tracks.

Track listing

References

External links
 

2006 films
Indian remakes of American films
2000s Hindi-language films
2006 romantic comedy films
Films scored by Himesh Reshammiya
Films shot in London
Films directed by Dharmesh Darshan
Hindi-language comedy films
Indian romantic comedy films